The Album is the debut studio album by British actor and singer Shane Richie. The album was released in 1997 and re-released in 2003 after Richie joined the cast of EastEnders. It contains mostly cover versions.

Track listing
"Sorry Seems to Be the Hardest Word" (4:15)
"How Long" (4:12)
"Just When I Needed You Most" (4:08)
"Daydream Believer" (3:17)
"A Little Bit More" (4:49)
"Love Grows (Where My Rosemary Goes)" (2:50)
"If" (3:10)
"How Can I Be Sure" (2:54)
"Angel's Gate" (3:14)
"She's Gone" (5:24)
"Bigger Than the Sky" (3:38)
"Tired of Being Alone" (3:04)
"I'm Gonna Make You Love Me" (3:58)
"Now We Don't Talk" (4:31)
"What a Fool Believes" (4:38)
"Everybody Wants to Rule the World" (4:10)
"Goodbye" (3:58)
"Grease Is the Word" (Cut the Quiff Mix) (3:42)

References

1997 debut albums
Shane Richie albums
Covers albums